Federal elections were held in Switzerland on 30 October 1881. The Radical Left remained the largest group in the National Council, regaining the majority they had lost in 1863.

Electoral system
The 145 members of the National Council were elected in 49 single- and multi-member constituencies using a three-round system. Candidates had to receive a majority in the first or second round to be elected; if it went to a third round, only a plurality was required. Voters could cast as many votes as there were seats in their constituency. There was one seat for every 20,000 citizens, with seats allocated to cantons in proportion to their population.

The elections were held under the new Federal law concerning the elections of National Council members passed on 3 May 1881. The number of seats was increased from 135 to 145 following the 1880 census, and the number of constituencies from 48 to 49; Bern and Zürich both gained two seats, whilst Appenzell Ausserrhoden, Basel-Stadt, Geneva, Schwyz, Ticino and Vaud all gained one.

Results

National Council 
Voter turnout was highest in Schaffhausen (where voting was compulsory) at 95.2% and lowest in Schwyz at 28.3%.

By constituency

Council of States

References

1881
Switzerland
1881 in Switzerland
October 1881 events